Hüseyinler is a village in Silifke district of Mersin Province, Turkey. The population of Hüseyinler was 572  as of 2011 . Hüseyinler is north of Kızkalesi (Corycus of the antiquity)  and Adamkayalar ( a location known for Roman rock reliefs.) Main activity of the village is agriculture. The crops include tomato and beans. Export of bay leaf also contribute to village economy.

References

Villages in Silifke District